Thierry Cassuto (born 29 April 1959, in Neuilly-Sur-Seine, in France) is a film and television producer based in Cape Town, South Africa. He studied at Université de la Sorbonne in Paris and at Boston University, where he graduated with a Master of Science in Broadcasting.

He is best known as the Executive Producer and co-creator with Zapiro of ZANEWS, the South African web and television satirical news puppet show loosely inspired by the cult British Spitting Image and French Guignols de l'info. Cassuto pitched the idea to South African broadcasters right after moving to South Africa from France in 1998 but kept on hearing that the country was "not ready" for satire. In 2008 he managed to convince the SABC to commission a 26-minute pilot but again the public broadcaster's management decided that the "people were not ready for this" and quickly banned it.
In October 2009, with the help of kulula.com  and the Mail & Guardian, Thierry Cassuto and Zapiro finally launched the show online., and in 2011 found a home for their show on television on satellite platform TopTV.

He is also the producer of the US adaptation of the show currently in development under the title Puppet Nation USA 

Before moving to South Africa in 1998, Cassuto founded the arts and entertainment French TV channel Paris Première and participated in the launch of the French terrestrial channel M6 where he started a slate of award-winning magazine programmes including Culture Pub and Capital. With partners Gédéon, he went on to create television production company TVTV (for "Tout Va Très Vite"), which was later acquired by AB Groupe.

In 2011 Cassuto won a Gold Pixel Bookmark for Best Online Video and was nominated for a SAMA South African Music Awards for the music video of the song "Chicken to Change" by South African band Freshlyground, which he directed. He also won six South African Film and Television Awards including Best Director in a TV Comedy and eight  DMMA Pixel Bookmarks as part of the ZANEWS team.

Notes and references

External links 
 ZANEWS Network
 Design Indaba 2011 Keynote Address by Thierry Cassuto and Jonathan Shapiro (aka Zapiro), published on Design Indaba, 2 August 2011
 Puppet Nation ZA aired this weekend, via Biz Community
 puppet-nation.com

1959 births
Living people
South African television producers
French television producers
French film producers
University of Paris alumni
Boston University College of Communication alumni
People from Neuilly-sur-Seine
French expatriates in the United States
French expatriates in South Africa